Prior to 1903, there was no strong party discipline in the province, and governments rarely lasted more than two years as independent-minded members changed allegiances. MLAs were elected under a myriad of party labels many as Independents, and no one party held strong majorities.

The first party government, in 1903, was Conservative. And disciplined party caucuses have been the backbone of BC provincial politics ever since.

A list of political parties currently registered with Elections BC can be found at the Elections BC website.

Parties represented in the current Legislative Assembly

Other parties that have formed governments

Historical parties that have been represented in the legislature

Current parties
Political parties currently registered to Elections BC as of November 19, 2022.

Historical parties

 Action Party (2001 iteration)
 Advocational International Democratic Party of British Columbia (2006–2014
 All Nations Party of British Columbia (2001 election–2005)
 Allegiance Party
 Alternative Party of British Columbia (?–2005) 
 Annexation Party of British Columbia (2003–2009)
 BC Ecosocialists
 BC First Party (2010–2018)
 British Columbia Party
 Canadian Alliance Party of British Columbia (?–2005)
 Central Party (British Columbia) (2001 election)
 Centre Democratic Party (2000–2005)
 Christian Democratic Party (1952 and 1953 elections)
 Citizens Action Party (BC Grey Party) (2002–2009)
 Citizens First Party (2017)
 Citizens Alliance Now (?–2007) (2001 election)
 Citizens Commonwealth Federation (2001 election)
 Common Sense, Community, Family Party (1996 election)
 Council of British Columbians (2001 election)
 Confederation Party of British Columbia (2003–2009)
 Constructive Party (1937 election)
 British Columbia Cultural Action Party
 Democratic Alliance (2004–2005)
 Democratic Futures Party (2003–2009)
 Democratic Idealists Party (2002)
 Emancipation Party (1941 election)
 Emerged Democracy Party of British Columbia (2004–2009) (2005 election)
 Enterprise Party of British Columbia
 Excalibur Party
 Family Coalition Party of British Columbia (1991 and 1996 elections)
 Feminist Initiative of BC (2005–2008)
 For British Columbia (4BC)
 Free Canadian Party (2003–2008)
 Freedom Party of British Columbia (2001–2009) (2001 and 2005 elections)
 Gay Alliance Toward Equality (1979 election)
 Green Go (Green Wing/Rhino) (1991 election)
 Helping Hand Party (2011–2013)
 Human Race Party (1991 election)
 Idealists Party (2003–2008)
 Independent New Hope Party (1979 election)
 Individual Rights Party of British Columbia (2011–2013)
 Financial Justice Party (1937 election)
 Labour Party (2004–2009)
 Labour Representation Committee (1952 election)
 Land Air Water Party (2015–2018) (2017 election)
 League for Socialist Action (1975 election)
 Link BC (2002–2009)
 Marijuana Party (2000–2019) (2001, 2005, 2009, and 2013 elections) 
 Millionaires Party (2002–2008)
 Moderate Democratic Movement (2003–2008) (2005 election)
 Nation Alliance Party (2007–2012) (2009 election)
 Natural Law Party of British Columbia (199?–2005)
 New Republican Party (2017–2019) (2017 election)
 New Wave Party (2011–2015)
 North American Labour Party (1975 and 1979 elections)
 Party of Citizens Who Have Decided to Think for Themselves and Be Their Own Politicians (2001 election)
 Patriot Party (2001–2013)
 People's Co-operative Commonwealth Federation (1945 election)
 People's Front (Marxist–Leninist) (1986 election - 2017)
 People's Party (1945, 1953 and 1956 elections)
 Planting Seeds Party (2006–2008)
 Platinum Party of Employers Who Think and Act to Increase Awareness
 ProBC
 Progressive Nationalist Party (Bloc BC Party) (2004–2013)
 Refederation Party (formerly Western Refederation Party; Western Independence Party)
 Religious Political Brotherhood (1941 election)
 Renewal Party of British Columbia (2004–2008)
 Revolutionary Marxist Group (1975 election)
 Revolutionary Workers Party 1945–1953
 The Sex Party (2005–2012) (2005 and 2009 elections)
 Social Conservative Party (1969 election)
 Socialist Labour Party
 United Front (1933 election)
 United Peoples Action Party (2003–2006)
 Unparty: The Consensus-Building Party (formerly the People's Senate Party)
 Vancouver Island Party
 Victory Without Debt Party (1941 election)
 Western Canada Concept Party of British Columbia (1980–2013)
 Western Independence Party (1979 election)
 Western National Party (1983 election)
 Western Reform (2001 election)
 Work Less Party of British Columbia (2003–2017)
 Unity Party (2001–2008)  (2001 & 2005 election)
 Youth Coalition (2000–2009)

See also
Elections BC
BC Legislature Raids
Municipal political parties in Vancouver

References

 
Parties
British Columbia